Suen "Iron Legs" Kam Shun (4 July 1907 – 9 August 1995) was a Chinese former footballer who played as a forward for the Chinese national football team during the 1920s. He also represented his nation at the 1936 Summer Olympics in Berlin.

He earned the nickname Iron Legs due to his ability to fiercely strike the ball, reportedly ripping the goal net on more than one occasion.

Career statistics

International

International goals
Scores and results list China's goal tally first.

References

1907 births
1995 deaths
Chinese footballers
China international footballers
Association football forwards
Footballers at the 1936 Summer Olympics
Olympic footballers of China